Yukari Kawamoto (born June 13, 1970, Kiyose, Tokyo, Japan) is a retired Japanese rhythmic gymnast.

She competed for Japan in the individual rhythmic gymnastics all-around competition at the 1992 Olympic Games in Barcelona. She placed 37th in the qualification round and didn't advance to the final.

References

External links 
 Yukari Kawamoto at Sports-Reference.com

1970 births
Living people
Japanese rhythmic gymnasts
Gymnasts at the 1992 Summer Olympics
Olympic gymnasts of Japan
People from Kiyose, Tokyo
Sportspeople from Tokyo Metropolis
Asian Games medalists in gymnastics
Gymnasts at the 1994 Asian Games
Asian Games gold medalists for Japan
Medalists at the 1994 Asian Games
Gymnasts from Tokyo
20th-century Japanese women
21st-century Japanese women